Wilhelm Mohr (11 August 1886 – 1978) was a Norwegian landowner and politician.

He was born in Fana to merchant and consul Conrad Mohr and Agnete Kroepelien, was a brother of Anton Mohr, and the father of airforce general Wilhelm Mohr. He served as mayor of the municipality of Fana for two periods, and was elected to the Storting for the periods 1919–1924 and 1931–1933. He was decorated Commander of the Order of St. Olav in 1946, and was a Commander of the Order of the Dannebrog, Commander of the Order of Vasa, and Commander of the Order of the White Rose of Finland.

References

1886 births
1978 deaths
Norwegian landowners
Mayors of places in Hordaland
Members of the Storting
Conservative Party (Norway) politicians
Commanders of the Order of Vasa
Commanders of the Order of the Dannebrog